This is a list of Acts of the Parliament of Northern Ireland, from its first session in 1921 to suspension in 1972.

The short titles for these Acts were distinguished from those passed by the Westminster parliament by the insertion of the bracketed words "Northern Ireland" between the word "Act" and the year.  Thus Police Act (Northern Ireland) 1970 was an Act passed by the Parliament of Northern Ireland, whereas the Police (Northern Ireland) Act 1998 was passed at Westminster.

As with UK legislation, Northern Ireland's Acts of Parliament were traditionally cited using the regnal year(s) of the parliamentary session in which they became law, though in 1954 this was retrospectively changed to calendar years beginning with 1943. Note that by convention "(N.I.)" is also added after the chapter number so as to avoid confusion with Westminster legislation.



1921–1929

1921

Appropriation Act (Northern Ireland) 1921
 Exchequer and Audit Act (Northern Ireland) 1921 c. 2 (N.I.) [12 Geo. 5]
Local Government (Emergency Powers) Act (Northern Ireland) 1921
Ministries of Northern Ireland Act (Northern Ireland) 1921 c.6 (N.I.)
Salaries of Ministerial Offices Act (Northern Ireland) 1921
Speaker of the House of Commons Act (Northern Ireland) 1921
Speaker of the Senate Act (Northern Ireland) 1921

1922
Appropriation Act (Northern Ireland) 1922
Appropriation (No. 2) Act (Northern Ireland) 1922
 Church Temporalities Fund Act (Northern Ireland) 1922 c. 13 (N.I.)
Civil Authorities (Special Powers) Act (Northern Ireland) 1922 c. 5 (N.I.) [12 & 13 Geo. 5]
Constabulary Act (Northern Ireland) 1922 c. 8 (N.I.) [12 & 13 Geo. 5]
Expiring Laws Act (Northern Ireland) 1922 c. 21 (N.I.) [12 & 13 Geo. 5]
 Finance Act (Northern Ireland) 1922 c. 18 (N.I.)
Joint Nursing and Midwives Council Act (Northern Ireland) 1922 c. 10 (N.I.)
Live Stock Breeding Act (Northern Ireland) 1922 c. 12 (N.I.)
Loans Guarantee Act (Northern Ireland) 1922
Local Authorities (Elections and Constitution) (Northern Ireland) Act 1922
Local Government Act (Northern Ireland) 1922
Londonderry Bridge Act (Northern Ireland) 1922
Motor Vehicle Races Act (Northern Ireland) 1922
National Health Insurance Act (Northern Ireland) 1922
Referees and Arbitrators (Procedure) Act (Northern Ireland) 1922
Solicitors Act (Northern Ireland) 1922
Unemployment Insurance (Amendment) Act (Northern Ireland) 1922
 Uniformity of Laws Act (Northern Ireland) 1922 c. 20 (N.I.)

1923

Appropriation Act (Northern Ireland) 1923
Appropriation (No. 2) Act (Northern Ireland) 1923
Bangor Gas Provisional Order Confirmation Act (Northern Ireland) 1923
Basil McCrea Endowments Act (Northern Ireland) 1923
Belfast Water Act (Northern Ireland) 1923
Belfast Corporation Act (Northern Ireland) 1923
Canals (Continuance of Charging Powers) Act (Northern Ireland) 1923
Companies (Reconstitution of Records) Act (Northern Ireland) 1923 c. 6 (N.I.)
Consolidated Fund and Appropriation Act (Northern Ireland) 1923
Constabulary Act (Northern Ireland) 1923
Criminal Evidence Act (Northern Ireland) 1923 13 & 14 Geo. 5 c. 9 (N.I.)
Criminal Law Amendment Act (Northern Ireland) 1923 c. 8  (N.I.)
Double Taxation Relief Act (Northern Ireland) 1923 c. 14 (N.I.)
Education Act (Northern Ireland) 1923 c. 21 (N.I.)
Electricity and Gas (Expenses) Act (Northern Ireland) 1923
Exchequer and Financial Provisions Act (Northern Ireland) 1923
Expiring Laws Continuance Act (Northern Ireland) 1923
Finance Act (Northern Ireland) 1923 c. 26 (N.I.)
Housing Act (Northern Ireland) 1923 c. 30 (N.I.)
Increase of Rent and Mortgage Interest Restrictions (Continuance) Act (Northern Ireland) 1923
Inspectors of Weights and Measures Act (Northern Ireland) 1923
Intoxicating Liquor Act (Northern Ireland) 1923 c. 12 (N.I.)
Labourers Act (Northern Ireland) 1923
Land Trust (Powers) Act (Northern Ireland) 1923
Loans Guarantee (Amendment) Act (Northern Ireland) 1923
 Local Government Act (Northern Ireland) 1923 c. 31 (N.I.)
Local Government (Franchise) Act (Northern Ireland) 1923
Local Government (Roads) Act (Northern Ireland) 1923 c. 10 (N.I.)
Office of Attorney-General Act (Northern Ireland) 1923
Petty Sessions Fees and Administration Act (Northern Ireland) 1923
Promissory Oaths Act (Northern Ireland) 1923
Public Records Act (Northern Ireland) 1923 c. 20 (N.I.)
Scutch Mills Act (Northern Ireland) 1923
Superannuation Act (Northern Ireland) 1923
Trade Boards Act (Northern Ireland) 1923 c. 32 (N.I.)
Unemployment Insurance Act (Northern Ireland) 1923
Workmen's Compensation Act (Northern Ireland) 1923 c. 33 (N.I.)

1924

Appropriation Act (Northern Ireland) 1924
Appropriation (No. 2) Act (Northern Ireland) 1924
Assurance Companies Act (Northern Ireland) 1924
Belfast Corporation Act (Northern Ireland) 1924
Belfast Water Act (Northern Ireland) 1924
Char-a-banc Regulation Act (Northern Ireland) 1924
Commissions of the Peace Act (Northern Ireland) 1924
Consolidated Fund Act (Northern Ireland) 1924
Constabulary (Acquisition of Land) Act (Northern Ireland) 1924 c. 17 (N.I.) [14 & 15 Geo. 5]
Dangerous Drugs and Poisons (Amendment) Act (Northern Ireland) 1924
Deceased Brother's Widow's Marriage Act (Northern Ireland) 1924 c. 22 (N.I.)
Exchequer and Financial Provisions Act (Northern Ireland) 1924
Expiring Laws Continuance Act (Northern Ireland) 1924
Explosives Act (Northern Ireland) 1924 c. 5 (N.I.)
Finance Act (Northern Ireland) 1924 14 & 15 Geo. 5 c. 19 (N.I.)
Housing Acts Amendment Act (Northern Ireland) 1924
Illegitimate Children (Affiliation Orders) Act (Northern Ireland) 1924 c. 27 (N.I.) [14 & 15 Geo. 5]
Industrial Assurance Act (Northern Ireland) 1924 c. 21 (N.I.)
Loans Guarantee Act (Northern Ireland) 1924
Local Government (Financial Provisions) Act (Northern Ireland) 1924
Londonderry Corporation Act (Northern Ireland) 1924
Marketing of Eggs Act (Northern Ireland) 1924
Ministers (Temporary Exercise of Powers) Act (Northern Ireland) 1924 c. 11 (N.I.) [14 & 15 Geo. 5]
Ministry of Home Affairs Provisional Order Confirmation (Bangor Water) Act (Northern Ireland) 1924
Ministry of Home Affairs Provisional Order Confirmation (Castlerock Waterworks) Act (Northern Ireland) 1924
National Health Insurance Act (Northern Ireland) 1924
Private Bill Procedure Act (Northern Ireland) 1924 c. 9 (N.I.)
Public Libraries Act (Northern Ireland) 1924
Time Act (Northern Ireland) 1924 c. 24 (N.I.)
Unemployment Insurance Act (Northern Ireland) 1924
Unemployment Insurance (No. 2) Act (Northern Ireland) 1924
Unemployment Insurance (Temporary Provisions) Act (Northern Ireland) 1924
Valuation Acts Amendment Act (Northern Ireland) 1924

1925

Appropriation Act (Northern Ireland) 1925
Appropriation (No. 2) Act (Northern Ireland) 1925
Administrative Provisions Act (Northern Ireland) 1925 c. 3 (N.I.) [15 & 16 Geo. 5]
Belfast Corporation Act (Northern Ireland) 1925
Canals (Continuance of Charging Powers) Act (Northern Ireland) 1925
Census Act (Northern Ireland) 1925
Charitable Loan Societies Act (Northern Ireland) 1925
 Civil Pensions Act (Northern Ireland) 1925 c. 2 (N.I.) [15 & 16 Geo. 5]
County Officers and Courts Act (Northern Ireland) 1925
Dangerous Drugs Act (Northern Ireland) 1925
Drainage Act (Northern Ireland) 1925 c. 24 (N.I.)
Education Act (Northern Ireland) 1925
Education (Administrative Provisions) Act (Northern Ireland) 1925
Expiring Laws Continuance Act (Northern Ireland) 1925
Finance Act (Northern Ireland) 1925 c. 30 (N.I.)
Finance (Estate Duty) Act (Northern Ireland) 1925 c. 9 (N.I.)
Government Loans and Exchequer Provisions Act (Northern Ireland) 1925
Housing Act (Northern Ireland) 1925
Intoxicating Liquor (Finance) Act (Northern Ireland) 1925
Local Authorities (University Grants) Act (Northern Ireland) 1925
Loans Guarantee Act (Northern Ireland) 1925
London Midland and Scottish Railway Act (Northern Ireland) 1925
Ministry of Home Affairs Provisional Order Confirmation (Londonderry County Borough) Act (Northern Ireland) 1925
Old Age Pensions Act (Northern Ireland) 1925
Pharmacy and Poisons Act (Northern Ireland) 1925 c. 8 (N.I.)
Public Health (Milk Regulations) Act (Northern Ireland) 1925
Rent and Mortgage Interest Restrictions Act (Northern Ireland) 1925
Rules Publication Act (Northern Ireland) 1925 c. 6 (N.I.)
Seed Potatoes Supply Act (Northern Ireland) 1925
Superannuation Act (Northern Ireland) 1925
Unemployment Fund Act (Northern Ireland) 1925
Unemployment Fund (No. 2) Act (Northern Ireland) 1925
Unemployment Insurance Act (Northern Ireland) 1925
Unemployment Insurance (Temporary Provisions) Act (Northern Ireland) 1925
Widows' Orphans' and Old Age Contributory Pensions Act (Northern Ireland)  1925
Wright's Divorce Act (Northern Ireland) 1925

1926

Administrative Provisions Act (Northern Ireland) 1926 c. 4 (N.I.) [16 & 17 Geo. 5]
Ancient Monuments Act (Northern Ireland) 1926 c. 12 (N.I.)
Appropriation Act 1926
Appropriation (No. 2) Act (Northern Ireland) 1926
Consolidated Fund Act (Northern Ireland) 1926
Economy (Exchequer Belief) Act (Northern Ireland) 1926
Emergency Powers Act (Northern Ireland) 1926 c. 8 (N.I.) [16 & 17 Geo. 5]
Exchequer and Financial Provisions Act (Northern Ireland) 1926
Expiring Laws Continuance Act (Northern Ireland) 1926
Finance (Stamp Duty) Act (Northern Ireland) 1926 c. 24 (N.I.)
Firearms (Amendment) Act (Northern Ireland) 1926
Horse Breeding Act (Northern Ireland) 1926 c. 30 (N.I.)
Housing Act (Northern Ireland) 1926
Housing (No. 2) Act (Northern Ireland) 1926
Industrial Assurance (Juvenile Societies) Act (Northern Ireland) 1926
Jury Laws Amendment Act (Northern Ireland) 1926 c. 15 (N.I.) [16 & 17 Geo. 5]
Loans Guarantee Act (Northern Ireland) 1926
Loans Guarantee (No. 2) Act (Northern Ireland) 1926
Local Government (War Service Payments) Act (Northern Ireland) 1926
Malone Training School Act (Northern Ireland) 1926
Marketing of Eggs Act (Northern Ireland) 1926
McCaldin's Divorce Act (Northern Ireland) 1926
Mines (Working Facilities, Support, etc.) Act (Northern Ireland) 1926
Motor Vehicles (Traffic and Regulation) Act (Northern Ireland) 1926
Municipal Corporations Act (Northern Ireland) 1926
Queen's University of Belfast Act (Northern Ireland) 1926
Pensions (Increase) Act (Northern Ireland) 1926
Pharmacy (Temporary Provisions) Act (Northern Ireland) 1926
Protection of Animals (Miscellaneous Provisions) Act (Northern Ireland) 1926
Teachers' Superannuation Act (Northern Ireland) 1926 c. 16 (N.I.)
Unemployment Insurance Act (Northern Ireland) 1926
Unemployment Insurance (Agreement) Act (Northern Ireland) 1926

1927

Agricultural Research Station Act (Northern Ireland) 1927 c. 1 (N.I.)
Appropriation Act (Northern Ireland) 1927
Carrickfergus Harbour Act (Northern Ireland) 1927
Dogs Act (Northern Ireland) 1927
Exchequer and Financial Provisions Act (Northern Ireland) 1927
Expiring Laws Continuance Act (Northern Ireland) 1927
Finance Act (Northern Ireland) 1927 c. 11 (N.I.)
Horticultural Produce (Sales on Commission) Act (Northern Ireland) 1927 c. 6 (N.I.)
Housing Act (Northern Ireland) 1927
Intoxicating Liquor and Licensing Act (Northern Ireland) 1927
Labourers Cottages (Loans) Act (Northern Ireland) 1927
Lead Paint (Protection against Poisoning) Act (Northern Ireland) 1927
Lemon's Divorce Act (Northern Ireland) 1927
Lisburn Electric Supply Company (Agreement) Act (Northern Ireland) 1927
Loans Guarantee Act (Northern Ireland) 1927
Ministry of Home Affairs Provisional Orders Confirmation Act (Northern Ireland) 1927
Newry Urban District Council Act (Northern Ireland) 1927
Old Age Pensions (Administration) Act (Northern Ireland) 1927
Portadown Urban District Council Act (Northern Ireland) 1927
Quarries Act (Northern Ireland) 1927 c.19 (NI)
 Railways (Road Vehicles) Act (Northern Ireland) 1927 c. 9 (N.I.)
Rent and Mortgage Interest Restrictions (Amendment) Act (Northern Ireland) 1927
River Bann Navigation Act (Northern Ireland) 1927
Salaries of Ministerial Offices Act (Northern Ireland) 1927
Sale of Milk Act (Northern Ireland) 1927
Trade Disputes and Trade Unions Act (Northern Ireland) 1927 c. 20 (N.I.)
Workmen's Compensation Act (Northern Ireland) 1927 c.16 (NI)
Workmen's Compensation (Amendments) Act (Northern Ireland) 1927

1928

Administrative Provisions Act (Northern Ireland) 1928 c. 14 (N.I.)
Antrim Electricity Supply Act (Northern Ireland) 1928
Appropriation Act (Northern Ireland) 1928
Appropriation (No. 2) Act (Northern Ireland) 1928
Bankers Act (Northern Ireland) 1928 c. 15 (N.I.)
Belfast Corporation Act (Northern Ireland) 1928
Borough Funds Act (Northern Ireland) 1928
Civil Authorities (Special Powers) Act (Northern Ireland) 1928
Consolidated Fund Act (Northern Ireland) 1928
Constabulary Act (Northern Ireland) 1928 c. 4 (N.I.)
Dromore Urban District Council Act (Northern Ireland) 1928
Education Associations Act (Northern Ireland) 1928
Egan's Divorce Act (Northern Ireland) 1928
Expiring Laws Continuance Act (Northern Ireland) 1928
Finance Act (Northern Ireland) 1928 c. 9 (N.I.)
Finance (No. 2) Act (Northern Ireland) 1928 c. 29 (N.I.)
Fisheries Act (Northern Ireland) 1928
Game Preservation Act (Northern Ireland) 1928 c. 25 (N.I.)
Hampton House School Act (Northern Ireland) 1928
Housing Act (Northern Ireland) 1928
Legitimacy Act (Northern Ireland) 1928 c. 5 (N.I.)
Loans Guarantee Act (Northern Ireland) 1928
Loans Guarantee (No. 2) Act (Northern Ireland) 1928
London Midland and Scottish Railway Act (Northern Ireland) 1928
Marketing of Eggs Act (Northern Ireland) 1928
Marketing of Potatoes Act (Northern Ireland) 1928
McMullan's Divorce Act (Northern Ireland) 1928
Methodist Church in Ireland Act (Northern Ireland) 1928
Methodist College Act (Northern Ireland) 1928
Ministry of Home Affairs Provisional Order Confirmation (Dromore Waterworks) Act (Northern Ireland) 1928
National Health Insurance Act (Northern Ireland) 1928
Poor Relief (Exceptional Distress) Act (Northern Ireland) 1928
Queen's University of Belfast Act (Northern Ireland) 1928 c. 21 (N.I.)
Rating and Valuation (Apportionment) Act (Northern Ireland) 1928 c. 30 (N.I.)
Rent and Mortgage Interest (Restrictions) Act (Northern Ireland) 1928
Representation of the People Act (Northern Ireland) 1928
Roads Improvement Act (Northern Ireland) 1928 c. 10 (N.I.)
School Sites Act (Northern Ireland) 1928 c. 8 (N.I.)
Slaughtered Animals (Compensation) Act (Northern Ireland) 1928
Superannuation and Other Trust Funds (Validation) Act (Northern Ireland) 1928 c. 6 (N.I.)
Unemployment Insurance Act (Northern Ireland) 1928

1929

Adoption of Children Act (Northern Ireland) 1929 c. 15 (N.I.)
Appropriation Act (Northern Ireland) 1929
Bangor Borough Council Act (Northern Ireland) 1929
Bankruptcy (Amendment) Act (Northern Ireland) 1929 c. 1 (N.I.)
Belfast Water Act (Northern Ireland) 1929
Brown's Divorce Act (Northern Ireland) 1929
Burns's Divorce Act (Northern Ireland) 1929
Criminal Lunatics Act (Northern Ireland) 1929
Drainage Act (Northern Ireland) 1929 c. 20 (N.I.)
Exchequer and Financial Provisions Act (Northern Ireland) 1929
Expiring Laws Continuance Act (Northern Ireland) 1929
Finance Act (Northern Ireland) 1929
Government Loans (Amendment) Act (Northern Ireland) 1929
House of Commons (Method of Voting and Redistribution of Seats) Act (Northern Ireland) 1929
Housing Act (Northern Ireland) 1929 c. 18 (N.I.)
Industrial Assurance and Friendly Societies Act (Northern Ireland) 1929
Industrial and Provident Societies (Amendment) Act (Northern Ireland) 1929
Local Government (Rating and Finance) Act (Northern Ireland) 1929
Loans Guarantee Act (Northern Ireland) 1929
Londonderry Corporation (New Bridge) Act (Northern Ireland) 1929
Marketing of Dairy Produce Act (Northern Ireland) 1929
Midwives and Nursing Homes Act (Northern Ireland) 1929 c. 6 (N.I.)
Ministry of Home Affairs Provisional Order Confirmation (Carrickfergus Water) Act (Northern Ireland) 1929
Motor Vehicles and Road Traffic Act (Northern Ireland) 1929 c. 21 (N.I.)
Newry Urban District Council and Newry Port and Harbour Trust Act (Northern Ireland) 1929
Noxious Weeds Act (Northern Ireland) 1929
Patterson's Divorce Act (Northern Ireland) 1929
Petroleum (Amendment) Act (Northern Ireland) 1929 c. 8 (N.I.)
Petroleum (Consolidation) Act (Northern Ireland) 1929 c. 13 (N.I.)
Rankin's Divorce Act (Northern Ireland) 1929
School Teachers (Oath and Declaration) Act (Northern Ireland) 1929
Street Trading (Regulation) Act (Northern Ireland) 1929 c. 9 (N.I.) [20 Geo. 5]
Timbey's Divorce Act (Northern Ireland) 1929
Unemployment Insurance (Agreement) Act (Northern Ireland) 1929
Unemployment Insurance (State Contribution) Act (Northern Ireland) 1929
Unemployment Insurance (Transitional Provisions Amendment) Act (Northern Ireland) 1929
Widows', Orphans' and Old Age Contributory Pensions Act (Northern Ireland) 1929

1930–1939

1930

 Companies Act (Northern Ireland) 1930 c. 12 (N.I.)
 Criminal Law and Prevention of Crime (Amendment) Act (Northern Ireland) 1930 c. 3 (N.I.)
 Education Act (Northern Ireland) 1930 c. 14 (N.I.)
 Finance Act (Northern Ireland) 1930 c. 11 (N.I.)
 Motor Vehicles and Road Traffic Act (Northern Ireland) 1930 c. 24 (N.I.)
 Railway and Canal Traffic (Amendment) Act (Northern Ireland) 1930 c. 10 (N.I.)
 Third Parties (Rights Against Insurers) Act (Northern Ireland) 1930 c. 19 (N.I.)
 Tithe Rentcharge and Variable Rents Act (Northern Ireland) 1930 c. 22 (N.I.)
 Weights and Measures (Amendment) Act (Northern Ireland) 1930 c. 16 (N.I.)

1931

 Agricultural Research Station Act (Northern Ireland) 1931 c. 20 (N.I.)
 Electricity (Supply) Act (Northern Ireland) 1931 c. 9 (N.I.)
 Finance Act (Northern Ireland) 1931 c. 24 (N.I.)
 Planning and Housing Act (Northern Ireland) 1931 c. 12 (N.I.)
 Wild Birds Protection Act (Northern Ireland) 1931 c. 14 (N.I.)

1932

 Allotments Act (Northern Ireland) 1932 c. 17 (N.I.)
 Companies Act (Northern Ireland) 1932 c. 7 (N.I.)
 Land Law (Miscellaneous Provisions) Act (Northern Ireland) 1932 c. 16 (N.I.)
 Mental Treatment Act (Northern Ireland) 1932 c. 15 (N.I.)
 Slaughter of Animals Act (Northern Ireland) 1932 c. 9 (N.I.)
 Valuation Acts Amendment Act (Northern Ireland) 1932 c. 26 (N.I.)

1933

 Administrative Provisions Act (Northern Ireland) 1933 c. 25 (N.I.)
 Agricultural Marketing Act (Northern Ireland) 1933 c. 22 (N.I.)
 Ardglass Dock and Harbour Act (Northern Ireland) 1933 c. 14 (N.I.)
 Civil Authorities (Special Powers) Act (Northern Ireland) 1933 c. 12 (N.I.)
 Criminal Justice Act (Northern Ireland) 1933 c. 31 (N.I.)
 Destructive Imported Animals Act (Northern Ireland) 1933 c. 5 (N.I.)
 Finance Act (Northern Ireland) 1933 c. 28 (N.I.)
 Grey Seals Protection Act (Northern Ireland) 1933 c. 11 (N.I.)
 Legislative Procedure Act (Northern Ireland) 1933 c. 4 (N.I.)
 Moneylenders Act (Northern Ireland) 1933 c. 23 (N.I.)
 Preferential Payments in Bankruptcy Act (Northern Ireland) 1933 c. 7 (N.I.)
 Probates and Letters of Administration Act (Northern Ireland) 1933 c. 16 (N.I.)
 Stormont Regulation and Government Property Act (Northern Ireland) 1933 c. 6 (N.I.)

1934

 Finance (Stamp Duties) Act (Northern Ireland) 1934 c. 3 (N.I.)
 Local Government Act (Northern Ireland) 1934 c. 22 (N.I.)
 Motor Vehicles and Road Traffic Act (Northern Ireland) 1934 c. 15 (N.I.)
 Railways Act (Northern Ireland) 1934 c. 5 (N.I.)

1935

 Summary Jurisdiction and Criminal Justice Act (Northern Ireland) 1935 c. 13 (N.I.) [25 & 26 Geo. 5]

1936

 Canals and Inland Navigation Act (Northern Ireland) 1936 c. 12 (N.I.)
 Finance Act (Northern Ireland) 1936 c. 33 (N.I.)
 Finance (Companies Stamp Duty) Act (Northern Ireland) 1936 c. 23
 Local Government (Finance) Act (Northern Ireland) 1936 c. 10 (N.I.)
 Old Age Pensions Act (Northern Ireland) 1936 c. 31 (N.I.)
 Revaluation (Consequential Provisions) Act (Northern Ireland) 1936 c. 11 (N.I.)
 Unemployment Insurance Act (Northern Ireland) 1936 c. 30 (N.I.)

1937

 Advertisements Regulation Act (Northern Ireland) 1937 c. 10 (N.I.)
 Arbitration Act (Northern Ireland) 1937 c. 8 (N.I.)
 Finance Act (Northern Ireland) 1937
 Finance (Number 2) Act (Northern Ireland) 1937 c. 17 (N.I.)
 Law Reform (Miscellaneous Provisions) Act (Northern Ireland) 1937 c. 9 (N.I.)
 Petroleum (Transfer of Licences) Act (Northern Ireland) 1937 c. 4 (N.I.)

1938

 Air-Raid Precautions Act (Northern Ireland) 1938 c. 26 (N.I.)
 Factories Act (Northern Ireland) 1938 c. 23 (N.I.)
 Hydrogen Cyanide (Fumigation) Act (Northern Ireland) 1938 c. 4 (N.I.)
 Solicitors Act (Northern Ireland) 1938 c. 14 (N.I.)
 University and Collegiate and Scientific Institutions Act (Northern Ireland) 1938 c. 18 (N.I.)

1939

 Agricultural Returns Act (Northern Ireland) 1939 c. 35 (N.I.)
 Agricultural Wages (Regulation) Act (Northern Ireland) 1939 c. 25 (N.I.)
 Civil Defence Act (Northern Ireland) 1939 c. 15 (N.I.)
 Essential Buildings and Plant (Repair of War Damage) Act (Northern Ireland) 1939 c. 34 (N.I.)
 Evidence Act (Northern Ireland) 1939 c. 12 (N.I.)
 Finance Act (Northern Ireland) 1939 c. 8 (N.I.)
 Finance (Number 2) Act (Northern Ireland) 1939 c. 26 (N.I.)
 Hairdressers Act (Northern Ireland) 1939 c. 3 (N.I.)
 Housing (Emergency Powers) Act (Northern Ireland) 1939 c. 32 (N.I.)
 Infanticide Act (Northern Ireland) 1939 c. 5 (N.I.)
 Liability for War Damage (Miscellaneous Provisions) Act (Northern Ireland) 1939 c. 36 (N.I.)
 Local Government Staffs (War Service) Act (Northern Ireland) 1939 c. 27 (N.I.)
 Matrimonial Causes Act (Northern Ireland) 1939 c. 13 (N.I.)
 Teachers' Salaries and Superannuation (War Service) Act (Northern Ireland) 1939 c. 33 (N.I.)

1940–1949

1940
 Finance Act (Northern Ireland) 1940 c. 20 (N.I.)
 Finance (Number 2) Act (Northern Ireland) 1940 c. 22 (N.I.)
 Hire Purchase Act (Northern Ireland) 1940 c. 10 (N.I.)
 Ministries Act (Northern Ireland) 1940 c. 11 (N.I.)
 Prevention of Frauds (Investments) Act (Northern Ireland) 1940 c. 9 (N.I.)
 Rent and Mortgage Interest (Restrictions) Act (Northern Ireland) 1940 c. 7 (N.I.)
 Truck Act (Northern Ireland) 1940 c. 21 (N.I.)
 Workmens' Compensation (Supplementary Allowance) Act (Northern Ireland) 1940 c. 18 (N.I.)

1941

 Clogher Valley Railway and Roads Act (Northern Ireland) 1941 c. 13 (N.I.)
 Excessive Rents (Prevention) Act (Northern Ireland) 1941 c. 20 (N.I.) [5 & 6 Geo. 6]
 Finance Act (Northern Ireland) 1941 c. 11 (N.I.)
 Landlord and Tenant (War Damage) Act (Northern Ireland) 1941 c. 9 (N.I.) [5 & 6 Geo. 6]
 Superannuation Schemes (War Service) Act (Northern Ireland) 1941 c. 6 (N.I.)

1942
 Finance Act (Northern Ireland) 1942 c. 14 (N.I.)
 Finance (Number 2) Act (Northern Ireland) 1942 c. 20 (N.I.)
 Housing (Temporary Accommodation) Act (Northern Ireland) 1942 c. 4 (N.I.) [6 & 7 Geo. 6]

1943
 Civil Authorities (Special Powers) Act (Northern Ireland) 1943 c. 2 (N.I.)
 Finance Act (Northern Ireland) 1943 c. 5 (N.I.)
 Rent Restriction Law (Amendment) Act (Northern Ireland) 1943 c. 9 (N.I.)
 Workmens' Compensation (Temporary Increases) Act (Northern Ireland) 1943 c. 13 (N.I.)

1944

 Accidental Fires Act (Northern Ireland) 1944 c. 5 (N.I.)
 Clogher Valley Railway Company (Winding-up) Act (Northern Ireland) 1944 c. 11 (N.I.)
 Constabulary Act (Northern Ireland) 1944 c. 9 (N.I.)
 Finance Act (Northern Ireland) 1944 c. 22 (N.I.)
 Housing (Requisitioning of Premises) Act (Northern Ireland) 1944 c. 13 (N.I.)
 Marriage (Declaration of Law) Act (Northern Ireland) 1944 c. 7 (N.I.)
 Ministries Act (Northern Ireland) 1944 c. 14 (N.I.)
 Planning (Interim Development) Act (Northern Ireland) 1944 c. 3 (N.I.)
 Rent Restriction (Defective Tenancies) Act (Northern Ireland) 1944 c. 6 (N.I.)

1945

 Bee Pest Prevention Act (Northern Ireland) 1945 c. 1 (N.I.)
 Belfast County Borough Administration Act (Northern Ireland) 1945 c. 8 (N.I.)
 Criminal Justice Act (Northern Ireland) 1945 c. 15 (N.I.)
 Disabled Persons (Employment) Act (Northern Ireland) 1945 c. 6 (N.I.)
 Housing Act (Northern Ireland) 1945 c. 2 (N.I.)
 Indictments Act (Northern Ireland) 1945 c. 16 (N.I.)
 Industries Development Act (Northern Ireland) 1945 c. 12 (N.I.)
 Medicines, Pharmacy and Poisons Act (Northern Ireland) 1945 c. 9 (N.I.)
 Summary Jurisdiction (Separation and Maintenance) Act (Northern Ireland) 1945 c. 14 (N.I.)
 Wages Councils Act (Northern Ireland) 1945 c. 21 (N.I.)
 Water Supplies and Sewerage Act (Northern Ireland) 1945 c. 17 (N.I.)

1946

 Elections and Franchise Act (Northern Ireland) 1946 c. 8 (N.I.)
 Finance Act (Northern Ireland) 1946 c. 1 (N.I.)
 Finance (Number 2) Act (Northern Ireland) 1946 c. 17 (N.I.)
 Housing and Local Government (Miscellaneous Provisions) Act (Northern Ireland) 1946 c. 4 (N.I.)
 Housing (No. 2) Act (Northern Ireland) 1946 c. 20 (N.I.)
 Industrial Assurance and Friendly Societies Act (Northern Ireland) 1946 c. 22 (N.I.)
 Loans Guarantee and Borrowing Regulation Act (Northern Ireland) 1946 c. 18 (N.I.)
 Local Government Elections (Validation) Act (Northern Ireland) 1946 c. 27 (N.I.)
 Marriage and Matrimonial Causes Act (Northern Ireland) 1946 c. 16
 Ministries Act (Northern Ireland) 1946 c. 11 (N.I.)
 National Insurance Act (Northern Ireland) 1946 c. 23 (N.I.)
 National Insurance (Industrial Injuries) Act (Northern Ireland) 1946 c. 21 (N.I.)
 Nurses Act (Northern Ireland) 1946 c. 15 (N.I.)
 Perjury Act (Northern Ireland) 1946 c. 13 (N.I.)
 Public Health (Tuberculosis) Act (Northern Ireland) 1946 c. 6 (N.I.)
 Shops Act (Northern Ireland) 1946 c. 7 (N.I.)
 Summary Jurisdiction (Miscellaneous Provisions) Act (Northern Ireland) 1946 c. 5 (N.I.)

1947

 Assurance Companies Act (Northern Ireland) 1947 c. 1 (N.I.)
 Drainage Act (Northern Ireland) 1947 c. 9 (N.I.)
 Education Act (Northern Ireland) 1947 c. 3 (N.I.)
 Emergency Laws (Miscellaneous Provisions) Act (Northern Ireland) 1947 c. 10 (N.I.)
 Finance Act (Northern Ireland) 1947 c. 15 (N.I.)
 Finance (Number 2) Act (Northern Ireland) 1947 c. 22 (N.I.)
 Frustrated Contracts Act (Northern Ireland) 1947 c. 2 (N.I.)
 Safeguarding of Employment Act (Northern Ireland) 1947 c. 24 (N.I.)
 Small Dwellings Acquisition Act (Northern Ireland) 1947 c. 8 (N.I.)

1948

 Development of Tourist Traffic Act (Northern Ireland) 1948 c. 4 (N.I.)
 Development Services Act (Northern Ireland) 1948 c. 25 (N.I.)
 Electricity (Supply) Act (Northern Ireland) 1948 c. 18 (N.I.)
 Finance Act (Northern Ireland) 1948 c. 15 (N.I.)
 Health Services Act (Northern Ireland) 1948 c. 3 (N.I.)
 Housing Act (Northern Ireland) 1948 c. 9 (N.I.)
 Industrial Assurance and Friendly Societies Act (Northern Ireland) 1948 c. 22 (N.I.)
 Law Reform (Miscellaneous Provisions) Act (Northern Ireland) 1948 c. 23 (N.I.)
 Mental Health Act (Northern Ireland) 1948 c. 17 (N.I.)
 National Assistance Act (Northern Ireland) 1948 c. 13 (N.I.)
 Roads Act (Northern Ireland) 1948 c. 28 (N.I.)
 Small Dwellings Acquisition Act (Northern Ireland) 1948 c. 6 (N.I.)
 Transport Act (Northern Ireland) 1948 c. 16

1949

 Agriculture Act (Northern Ireland) 1949 c. 2 (N.I.)
 Constabulary (Pensions) Act (Northern Ireland) 1949 c. 9 (N.I.)
 Exchequer and Financial Provisions Act (Northern Ireland) 1949 c. 12 (N.I.)
 Finance Act (Northern Ireland) 1949 c. 15 (N.I.)
 Finance (Miscellaneous Provisions) Act (Northern Ireland) 1949 c. 4 (N.I.)
 Fisheries Act (Northern Ireland) 1949 c. 22 (N.I.)
 Public Health and Local Government (Miscellaneous Provisions) Act (Northern Ireland) 1949 c. 21 (N.I.)
 Marketing of Poultry Act (Northern Ireland) 1949 c. 14 (N.I.)
 Statistics of Trace Act (Northern Ireland) 1949 c. 7 (N.I.)
 Superannuation Act (Northern Ireland) 1949 c. 13 (N.I.)
 Welfare Services Act (Northern Ireland) 1949 c. 1 (N.I.)

1950–1959

1950

 Adoption of Children Act (Northern Ireland) 1950 c. 6 (N.I.)
 Children and Young Persons Act (Northern Ireland) 1950 c. 5 (N.I.)
 Civil Defence Act (Northern Ireland) 1950 c. 11 (N.I.)
 Company Law Amendment Act (Northern Ireland) 1950 c. 24 (N.I.)
 Control of Greyhounds etc. Act (Northern Ireland) 1950 c. 13 (N.I.)
 Employment and Training Act (Northern Ireland) 1950 c. 29 (N.I.)
 Erne Drainage and Development Act (Northern Ireland) 1950 c. 15 (N.I.)
 Exchequer and Financial Provisions Act (Northern Ireland) 1950 c. 3 (N.I.)
 Finance Act (Northern Ireland) 1950
 Finance (No. 2) Act (Northern Ireland) 1950 c. 32 (N.I.)
 Local Government (Superannuation) Act (Northern Ireland) 1950 c. 10 (N.I.)
 Milk Act (Northern Ireland) 1950 c. 31 (N.I.)
 Probation Act (Northern Ireland) 1950 c. 7 (N.I.)

1951

 Administrative and Financial Provisions Act (Northern Ireland) 1951 c. 5 (N.I.)
 Age of Marriage Act (Northern Ireland) 1951 c. 25 (N.I.)
 Appropriation Act (Northern Ireland) 1951 c. 14 (N.I.)
 Appropriation (Number 2) Act (Northern Ireland) 1951 c. 26 (N.I.)
 Consolidated Fund Act (Northern Ireland) 1951 c. 11 (N.I.)
 Criminal Procedure Act (Northern Ireland) 1951 c. 24 (N.I.)
 Education (Amendment) Act (Northern Ireland) 1951 c. 10 (N.I.)
 Expiring Laws Continuance Act (Northern Ireland) 1951 c. 27 (N.I.)
 Finance Act (Northern Ireland) 1951 c. 17 (N.I.)
 Finance Act 1948 (Amendment) Act (Northern Ireland) 1951 c. 12 (N.I.)
 Game Law Amendment Act (Northern Ireland) 1951 c. 4 (N.I.)
 Health services (Hospitals Endowments) Act (Northern Ireland) 1951 c. 21 (N.I.)
 Housing Act (Northern Ireland) 1951 c. 13 (N.I.)
 Judicial Pensions Act (Northern Ireland) 1951 c. 20 (N.I.)
 Law Reform (Miscellaneous Provisions) Act (Northern Ireland) 1951 c. 7 (N.I.)
 Public Order Act (Northern Ireland) 1951 c. 19 (N.I.)
 Rent Restriction Law (Amendment) Act (Northern Ireland) 1951 c. 23 (N.I.)
 Short Titles Act (Northern Ireland) 1951 c. 1 (N.I.)
 Statutory charges Register Act (Northern Ireland) 1951 c. 3 (N.I.)
 Superannuation (Miscellaneous Provisions) Act (Northern Ireland) 1951 c. 28 (N.I.)
 Transport (Special Inquiries) Act (Northern Ireland) 1951 c. 22 (N.I.)
 Workmens' Compensation (Supplementation) Act (Northern Ireland) 1951 c. 16 (N.I.)

1952

 Administrative and Financial Provisions Act (Northern Ireland) 1952 c. 7 (N.I.)
 Appropriation Act (Northern Ireland) Act 1952 c. 9 (N.I.)
 Appropriation (Number 2) Act (Northern Ireland) 1952 c. 20 (N.I.)
 Consolidated Fund Act (Northern Ireland) 1952 c. 4 (N.I.)
 Development of Tourist Traffic (Amendment) Act (Northern Ireland) 1952 c. 3 (N.I.)
 Expiring Laws Continuance Act (Northern Ireland) 1952 c. 26 (N.I.)
 Exported Animals (Compensation) Act (Northern Ireland) 1952 c. 24 (N.I.)
 Finance Act (Northern Ireland) 1952 c. 13 (N.I.)
 Foyle Fisheries Act (Northern Ireland) 1952 c. 5 (N.I.)
 House to House Charitable Collections Act (Northern Ireland) 1952 c. 6 (N.I.)
 Married Women (Restraint Upon Anticipation) Act (Northern Ireland) 1952 c. 19 (N.I.)
 Ministerial Offices Act (Northern Ireland) 1952 c. 15 (N.I.) [1 & 2 Eliz. 2]
 The Queen's University of Belfast (Trusts) Act (Northern Ireland) 1952 c. 22 (N.I.)
 Statute Law Revision Act (Northern Ireland) 1952 c. 1 (N.I.)

1953

 Appropriation Act (Northern Ireland) 1953 c. 20 (N.I.)
 Appropriation (Number 2) Act (Northern Ireland) 1953 c. 31 (N.I.)
 Consolidated Fund Act (Northern Ireland) 1953 c. 9 (N.I.)
 Control of Fertilizers Act (Northern Ireland) 1953 c. 33 (N.I.)
 Criminal Justice Act (Northern Ireland) 1953 c. 14 (N.I.)
 Education (Amendment) Act (Northern Ireland) 1953 c. 11 (N.I.)
 Expiring Laws Continuance Act (Northern Ireland) 1953 c. 34 (N.I.)
 Finance Act (Northern Ireland) 1953 c. 23 (N.I.)
 Forestry Act (Northern Ireland) 1953 c. 2 (N.I.)
 Great Northern Railway Act (Northern Ireland) 1953 c. 25 (N.I.)
 Juries Act (Northern Ireland) 1953 c. 19 (N.I.)
 Miscellaneous Transferred Excise Duties Act (Northern Ireland) 1953 c. 24 (N.I.)
 Prison Act (Northern Ireland) 1953 c. 18 (N.I.)
 Public Works &c Loans Act (Northern Ireland) 1953 c. 13 (N.I.)
 Re-equipment of Industry (Amendment) Act (Northern Ireland) 1953 c. 8 (N.I.)
 Repeal of Unnecessary Laws Act (Northern Ireland) 1953 c. 5 (N.I.)
 Slaughter-Houses Act (Northern Ireland) 1953 c. 21 (N.I.)
 Statute Law Revision Act (Northern Ireland) 1953 c. 1 (N.I.)
 Summary Jurisdiction Act (Northern Ireland) 1953 c. 3 (N.I.)
 Valuation Acts Amendment Act (Northern Ireland) 1953 c. 10 (N.I.)

1954

 Administration of Justice Act (Northern Ireland) 1954 c. 9 (N.I.)
 Agriculture (Poisonous Substances) Act (Northern Ireland) 1954 c. 5 (N.I.)
 Agriculture (Temporary Assistance) Act (Northern Ireland) 1954 c. 31 (N.I.)
 Appropriation Act (Northern Ireland) 1954 c. 22 (N.I.)
 Appropriation (Number 2) Act (Northern Ireland) 1954 c. 24 (N.I.)
 Charitable Trusts (Validation) Act (Northern Ireland) 1954 c. 27 (N.I.)
 Common Informers Act (Northern Ireland) 1954 c. 11 (N.I.)
 Consolidated Fund Act (Northern Ireland) 1954 c. 7 (N.I.)
 Excise (Amendment) Act (Northern Ireland) 1954 c. 8 (N.I.)
 Expiring Laws Continuance Act (Northern Ireland) 1954 c. 25 (N.I.)
 Finance Act (Northern Ireland) 1954 c. 23 (N.I.)
 Finance (Miscellaneous Provisions) Act (Northern Ireland) 1954 c. 3 (N.I.)
 Flags and Emblems (Display) Act (Northern Ireland) 1954 c. 10 (N.I.) [2 & 3 Eliz. 2]
 General Dealers (Amendment) Act (Northern Ireland) 1954 c. 4 (N.I.)
 Inland Navigation Act (Northern Ireland) 1954 c. 1 (N.I.)
 Interpretation Act (Northern Ireland) 1954 c. 33 (N.I.) [2 & 3 Eliz. 2]
 Law Reform (Miscellaneous Provisions) Act (Northern Ireland) 1954 c. 26 (N.I.)
 Marriages Act (Northern Ireland) 1954 c. 21 (N.I.)
 Pawnbrokers Act (Northern Ireland) 1954 c. 30 (N.I.)
 Rents Tribunals (Extension of Jurisdiction) Act (Northern Ireland) 1954 c. 16 (N.I.)
 Statute Law Revision Act (Northern Ireland) 1954 c. 35 (N.I.)
 Statutory Rules Act (Northern Ireland) 1954 c. 19 (N.I.)
 Vaughan's Charity (Administration) Act (Northern Ireland) 1954 c. 28 (N.I.)
 Vehicles (Excise) Act (Northern Ireland) 1954 c. 17 (N.I)
 Wills (Amendment) Act (Northern Ireland) 1954 c. 20 (N.I.)

1955

 Administration of Estates Act (Northern Ireland) 1955 c. 24 (N.I.)
 Consolidated Fund (Miscellaneous Provisions) Act (Northern Ireland) 1955 c. 6 (N.I.)
 Defamation Act (Northern Ireland) 1955 c. 11 (N.I.)
 Finance (Miscellaneous Provisions) Act (Northern Ireland) 1955 c. 19 (N.I.)
 Government Property (Amendment) Act (Northern Ireland) 1955 c. 2 (N.I.)
 Lough Neagh and Lower Bann Drainage and Navigation Act (Northern Ireland) 1955 c. 15 (N.I.)
 Public Health and Local Government (Miscellaneous Provisions) Act (Northern Ireland) 1955 c. 13 (N.I.)

1956

 Administrative and Financial Provisions Act (Northern Ireland) 1956 c. 17 (N.I.)
 Education (Amendment) Act (Northern Ireland) 1956 c. 24 (N.I.)
 Educational Endowments (Confirmation of Schemes) Act (Northern Ireland) 1956 c. 15 (N.I.)
 Finance Act (Northern Ireland) 1956 4 & 5 Eliz. 2 c. 11
 Housing (Miscellaneous Provisions) and Rent Restriction Law (Amendment) Act (Northern Ireland) 1956 c. 10 (N.I.)

1957

 Agriculture (Temporary Assistance) (Amendment) Act (Northern Ireland) 1957 c. 3 (N.I.)
 Finance Act (Northern Ireland) 1957 c. 15 (N.I.)
 Friendly Societies Act (Northern Ireland) 1957 c. 1 (N.I.)
 King George VI Memorial Youth Council Act (Northern Ireland) 1957 c. 23 (N.I.)
 Marketing of Eggs Act (Northern Ireland) 1957 c. 27 (N.I.)
 Occupiers' Liability Act (Northern Ireland) 1957 c. 25 (N.I.)

1958

 Administrative and Financial Provisions Act (Northern Ireland) 1958 c. 20 (N.I.)
 Finance Act (Northern Ireland) 1958 c. 14 (N.I.)
 Hotel Proprietors Act (Northern Ireland) 1958 c. 32 (N.I.)
 Recreational Charities Act (Northern Ireland) 1958 c. 16 (N.I.)
 Statutory Rules Act (Northern Ireland) 1958 c. 18 (N.I.)
 Summary Jurisdiction and Criminal Justice Act (Northern Ireland) 1958 c. 9 (N.I.)
 Trading Representations (Disabled Persons) Act (Northern Ireland) 1958 c. 24 (N.I.)
 Trustee Act (Northern Ireland) 1958 c. 23 (N.I.)

1959

 Agriculture (Miscellaneous Provisions) Act (Northern Ireland) 1959 c. 2 (N.I.)
 Coroners Act (Northern Ireland) 1959 c. 15 (N.I.)
 County Courts Act (Northern Ireland) 1959 c. 25 (N.I.)
 Finance Act (Northern Ireland) 1959 7 & 8 Eliz. 2 c. 9 (N.I.)
 Minerals (Miscellaneous Provisions) Act (Northern Ireland) 1959 c. 17 (N.I.)

1960–1969

1960

 Attempted Rape, etc., Act (Northern Ireland) 1960 c. 3 (N.I.)
 Companies Act (Northern Ireland) 1960 c. 22 (N.I.)
 Inheritance (Family Provision) Act (Northern Ireland) 1960 c. 15 (N.I.)
 Mortmain (Repeals) Act (Northern Ireland) 1960 c. 20 (N.I.)
 Resident Magistrates' Pensions Act (Northern Ireland) 1960 c. 2 (N.I.)

1961

 Finance Act (Northern Ireland) 1961 c. 10 (N.I.)
 Housing Act (Northern Ireland) 1961 c. 12 (N.I.)
 Legitimacy Act (Northern Ireland) 1961 c. 5 (N.I.)
 Mental Health Act (Northern Ireland) 1961 c. 15 (N.I.)
 Rights of Light Act (Northern Ireland) 1961 c. 18 (N.I.)

1962

 Administrative and Financial Provisions Act (Northern Ireland) 1962 c. 7 (N.I.)
 Agricultural Produce (Meat Regulation and Pig Industry) Act (Northern Ireland) 1962 c. 13 (N.I.)
 Electoral Law Act (Northern Ireland) 1962 c. 14 (N.I.)
 Finance Act (Northern Ireland) 1962 c. 17 (N.I.)
 Foyle Fisheries (Amendment) Act (Northern Ireland) 1962 c. 5 (N.I.)
 Human Tissue Act (Northern Ireland) 1962 c. 19 (N.I.)
 Public Health and Local Government (Miscellaneous Provisions) Act (Northern Ireland) 1962 c. 12 (N.I.)

1963

 Caravans Act (Northern Ireland) 1963 c. 17 (N.I.)
 Finance Act (Northern Ireland) 1963 c. 22 (N.I.)
 Housing Act (Northern Ireland) 1963 c. 26 (N.I.)
 Recorded Delivery Service Act (Northern Ireland) 1963 c. 5 (N.I.)
 Stock Transfer Act (Northern Ireland) 1963 c. 24 (N.I.)

1964

 Administrative and Financial Provisions Act (Northern Ireland) 1964 c. 6 (N.I.)
 Agricultural Marketing Acts (Northern Ireland) 1964 c. 13 (N.I.)
 Business Tenancies Act (Northern Ireland) 1964 c. 36 (N.I.)
 Charities Act (Northern Ireland) 1964 c. 33 (N.I.)
 Emergency Powers (Amendment) Act (Northern Ireland) 1964 c. 34 (N.I.)
 Finance Act (Northern Ireland) 1964 c. 24 (N.I.)
 Housing (Miscellaneous Provisions) Act (Northern Ireland) 1964 c. 26 (N.I.)
 Lands Tribunal and Compensation Act (Northern Ireland) 1964 c. 29 (N.I.)
 Law Reform (Husband and Wife) Act (Northern Ireland) 1964 c. 23 (N.I.)
 Magistrates' Courts Act (Northern Ireland) 1964 c. 21 (N.I.)
 Marketing of Potatoes Act (Northern Ireland) 1964 c. 8 (N.I.)
 Petroleum (Production) Act (Northern Ireland) 1964 c. 28 (N.I.)
 Pig Production Development Act (Northern Ireland) 1964 c. 25 (N.I.)

1965

 Administrative and Financial Provisions Act (Northern Ireland) 1965 c. 12 (N.I.)
 Agriculture (Miscellaneous Provisions) Act (Northern Ireland) 1965 c. 3 (N.I.)
 Contracts of Employment and Redundancy Payments Act (Northern Ireland) 1965 c. 19 (N.I.)
 Factories Act (Northern Ireland) 1965 c. 20 (N.I.)
 Finance Act (Northern Ireland) 1965 c. 16 (N.I.)
 Land Development Values (Compensation) Act (Northern Ireland) 1965 c. 23 (N.I.)
 Ministerial Salaries and Members' Pensions Act (Northern Ireland) 1965 c. 18
 New Towns Act (Northern Ireland) 1965 c. 13 (N.I.)
 Seeds Act (Northern Ireland) 1965 c. 22 (N.I.)
 Trading Stamps Act (Northern Ireland) 1965 c. 6 (N.I.)

1966

 Criminal Justice Act (Northern Ireland) 1966 c. 20 (N.I.)
 Finance Act (Northern Ireland) 1966 c. 21 (N.I.)
 Fisheries Act (Northern Ireland) 1966 c. 17 (N.I.)
 Hire-Purchase Act (Northern Ireland) 1966 c. 42 (N.I.)
 Horticulture Act (Northern Ireland) 1966 c. 15 (N.I.)
 Inalienable Lands Act (Northern Ireland) 1966 c. 31 (N.I.)
 Local Government Act (Northern Ireland) 1966 c. 38 (N.I.)
 Maintenance and Affiliation Orders Act (Northern Ireland) 1966 c. 35 (N.I.)
 Matrimonial Causes (Reports) Act (Northern Ireland) 1966 c. 29 (N.I.)
 National Insurance Act (Northern Ireland) 1966 c. 6 (N.I.)
 National Insurance (Industrial Injuries) Act (Northern Ireland) 1966 c. 9 (N.I.)
 New Universities (Acquisition of Land) Act (Northern Ireland) 1966 c. 4 (N.I.)
 Office and Shop Premises Act (Northern Ireland) 1966 c. 26 (N.I.)
 Perpetuities Act (Northern Ireland) 1966 c. 2 (N.I.)
 Superannuation (Amendment) Act (Northern Ireland) 1966 c. 27 (N.I.)

1967

 Administration of Estates (Small Payments) Act (Northern Ireland) 1967 c. 5 (N.I.)
 Agriculture (Miscellaneous Provisions) Act (Northern Ireland) 1967 c. 15 (N.I.)
 Criminal Law Act (Northern Ireland) 1967 c. 18 (N.I.)
 Diseases of Fish Act (Northern Ireland) 1967 c. 7 (N.I.)
 Finance Act (Northern Ireland) 1967 c. 20 (N.I.)
 Fishing Vessels (Grants) Act (Northern Ireland) 1967 c. 8. (N.I.)
 Increase of Fines Act (Northern Ireland) 1967 c. 29 (N.I.)
 Livestock Marketing Commission Act (Northern Ireland) 1967 c. 21 (N.I.)
 Misrepresentation Act (Northern Ireland) 1967 c. 14 (N.I.)
 Plant Health Act (Northern Ireland) 1967 c. 28 (N.I.)
 Public Health Act (Northern Ireland) 1967 c. 36 (N.I.)
 Superannuation Act (Northern Ireland) 1967 c. 24 (N.I.)
 Transport Act (Northern Ireland) 1967 c. 37 (N.I.)
 Weights and Measures Act (Northern Ireland) 1967 c. 6 (N.I.)

1968

 Children and Young Persons Act (Northern Ireland) 1968 c. 34 (N.I.)
 Costs in Criminal Cases Act (Northern Ireland) 1968 c. 10 (N.I.)
 Criminal Justice (Miscellaneous Provisions) Act (Northern Ireland) 1968 c. 28 (N.I.)
 Development Loans (Agriculture and Fisheries) Act (Northern Ireland) 1968 c. 21 (N.I.)
 Electoral Law Act (Northern Ireland) 1968 c. 20 (N.I.)
 Family Allowances and National Insurance Act (Northern Ireland) 1968 c. 1 (N.I.)
 Finance Act (Northern Ireland) 1968 c. 17 (N.I.)
 Financial Provisions Act (Northern Ireland) 1968 c. 25 (N.I.)
 Fisheries (Amendment) Act (Northern Ireland) 1968 c. 31 (N.I.)
 Insurance Companies Act (Northern Ireland) 1968 c. 6 (N.I.)
 Legislative Procedure Act (Northern Ireland) 1968 c. 24 (N.I.)
 Malone and Whiteabbey Training Schools Act (Northern Ireland) 1968 c. 7 (N.I.)
 New Towns (Amendment) Act (Northern Ireland) 1968 c. 33 (N.I.)
 Poultry Improvement Act (Northern Ireland) 1968 c. 12 (N.I.)
 Public Expenditure and Receipts Act (Northern Ireland) 1968 c. 8 (N.I.)
 Treatment of Offenders Act (Northern Ireland) 1968 c. 29 (N.I.)

1969

 Adoption (Hague Convention) Act (Northern Ireland) 1969 c. 22 (N.I.)
 Age of Majority Act (Northern Ireland) 1969 c. 28 (N.I.)
 Census Act (Northern Ireland) 1969 c. 8 (N.I.)
 Commissioner for Complaints Act (Northern Ireland) 1969 c. 25 (N.I.)
 Community Relations Act (Northern Ireland) 1969 c. 23 (N.I.)
 Electoral Law Act (Northern Ireland) 1969 c. 26 (N.I.)
 Family Provision Act (Northern Ireland) 1969 c. 38 (N.I.)
 Firearms Act (Northern Ireland) 1969 c. 12 (N.I.)
 Grand Jury (Abolition) Act (Northern Ireland) 1969 c. 15 (N.I.)
 Industrial and Provident Societies Act (Northern Ireland) 1969 c. 24 (N.I.)
 Livestock Marketing Commission (Amendment) Act (Northern Ireland) 1969 c. 9 (N.I.)
 Marketing of Eggs (Amendment) Act (Northern Ireland) 1969 c. 33 (N.I.)
 Mineral Development Act (Northern Ireland) 1969 c. 35 (N.I.)
 Mines Act (Northern Ireland) 1969 c. 6 (N.I.)
 Parliamentary Commissioner Act (Northern Ireland) 1969 c. 10
 Protection of the Person and Property Act (Northern Ireland) 1969 c. 29 (N.I.)
 Superannuation (Miscellaneous Provisions) Act (Northern Ireland) 1969 c. 7 (N.I.)
 Theft Act (Northern Ireland) 1969 c. 16 (N.I.)

1970–1972

1970

 Agriculture (Miscellaneous Provisions) Act (Northern Ireland) 1970 c. 20 (N.I.)
 Criminal Justice (Temporary Provisions) Act (Northern Ireland) 1970 c. 22 (N.I.)
 Equal Pay Act (Northern Ireland) 1970 c. 32 (N.I.)
 Explosives Act (Northern Ireland) 1970 c. 10 (N.I.)
 Finance Act (Northern Ireland) 1970 c. 21 (N.I.)
 Friendly Societies Act (Northern Ireland) 1970 c. 31 (N.I.)
 Harbours Act (Northern Ireland) 1970 c. 1 (N.I.)
 Land Registration Act (Northern Ireland) 1970 c. 18 (N.I.)
 Lough Neagh Drainage (Amendment) Act (Northern Ireland) 1970 c. 7 (N.I.)
 Magee University College Londonderry Act (Northern Ireland) 1970 c. 15 (N.I.)
 Maintenance and Affiliation Orders Act (Northern Ireland) 1970 c. 16 (N.I.)
 Police Act (Northern Ireland) 1970 c. 9 (N.I.)
 Prevention of Incitement to Hatred Act (Northern Ireland) 1970 c. 24 (N.I.)
 Printed Documents Act (Northern Ireland) 1970 c. 30 (N.I.)
 Public Order (Amendment) Act (Northern Ireland) 1970 c. 4 (N.I.)
 Registration of Deeds Act (Northern Ireland) 1970 c. 25 (N.I.)
 Road Traffic Act (Northern Ireland) 1970 c. 2 (N.I.)

1971

 Administration of Estates Act (Northern Ireland) 1971 c. 31 (N.I.)
 Civil Evidence Act (Northern Ireland) 1971 c. 36 (N.I.)
 Criminal Procedure (Majority Verdicts) Act (Northern Ireland) 1971 c. 37 (N.I.)
 Electoral Law Act (Northern Ireland) 1971 c. 4 (N.I.)
 Finance Act (Northern Ireland) 1971 c. 27 (N.I.)
 Financial Provisions Act (Northern Ireland) 1971 c. 6 (N.I.)
 Housing Executive Act (Northern Ireland) 1971 c. 5 (N.I.)
 Indecent Advertisements (Amendment) Act (Northern Ireland) 1971 c. 18 (N.I.)
 Leasehold (Enlargement and Extension) Act (Northern Ireland) 1971 c. 7 (N.I.)
 Licensing Act (Northern Ireland) 1971 c. 13 (N.I.)
 Local Government Boundaries Act (Northern Ireland) 1971 c. 9 (N.I.)
 Nursing Homes and Nursing Agencies Act (Northern Ireland) 1971 c. 32 (N.I.)
 Pensions (Increase) Act (Northern Ireland) 1971 c. 35 (N.I.)
 Planning and Land Compensation Act (Northern Ireland) 1971 c. 23 (N.I.)
 Powers of Attorney Act (Northern Ireland) 1971 c. 33 (N.I.)
 Resettlement Services Act (Northern Ireland) 1971 c. 10 (N.I.)
 Social Services (Parity) Act (Northern Ireland) 1971 c. 21 (N.I.)
 Transport (Amendment) Act (Northern Ireland) 1971 c. 14 (N.I.)
 Welfare Services Act (Northern Ireland) 1971 c. 2 (N.I.)

1972

 Agriculture (Abolition of County Committees) Act (Northern Ireland) 1972 c. 15 (N.I.)
 Evidence of Alibi Act (Northern Ireland) 1972 c. 6 (N.I.)
 Fish Industry Act (Northern Ireland) 1972 c. 4 (N.I.)
 Housing on Farms Act (Northern Ireland) 1972 c. 3 (N.I.)
 Local Government Act (Northern Ireland) 1972 c. 9 (N.I.)
 Miscellaneous Transferred Excise Duties Act (Northern Ireland) 1972 c. 11 (N.I.)
 Public Utilities (Emergency Powers) Act (Northern Ireland) 1972 c. 2 (N.I.)
 Welfare of Animals Act (Northern Ireland) 1972 c. 7 (N.I.)

See also
List of Acts of the Northern Ireland Assembly
List of Orders in Council for Northern Ireland

References

Sources
The Statute Law Database has the revised statutes of Northern Ireland (incorporating changes made by legislation up to 31 December 2005) and the Acts made since that date.
The Belfast Gazette: Archive

Northern Ireland
Northern Ireland politics-related lists
 
Northern Ireland law-related lists